Al Huda School may refer to:
 Al Huda School (Maryland) - College Park, Maryland (Washington, DC area)
 Al-Huda School (New Jersey) - Paterson, New Jersey (New York area)
 Al-Huda School - Camp Hill, Pennsylvania (Harrisburg area)
 Al-Huda Islamic School - Tucson, Arizona